Teryut (Törüt) is a rural locality (a selo), the only inhabited locality, and the administrative center of Teryutsky Rural Okrug of Oymyakonsky District in the Sakha Republic, Russia, located  from Ust-Nera, the administrative center of the district. Its population as of the 2010 Census was 355, of whom 164 were male and 158 female, down from 411 as recorded during the 2002 Census.

References

Notes

Sources
Official website of the Sakha Republic. Registry of the Administrative-Territorial Divisions of the Sakha Republic. Oymyakonsky District. 

Rural localities in Oymyakonsky District